Synuchus impunctatus is a species of ground beetle in the subfamily Harpalinae. It was described by Thomas Say in 1823.

References

Synuchus
Beetles described in 1823